Prince Valiant is a 1997 Irish-British independent sword and sorcery film directed by Anthony Hickox, written by Michael Frost Beckner, and starring Stephen Moyer, Katherine Heigl, Thomas Kretschmann, Joanna Lumley, Ron Perlman, and Edward Fox. It is a loose adaptation of the long-running Prince Valiant comic strip of Hal Foster, some panels of which were used in the movie. In it, Valiant must battle the Vikings and a scheming sorceress to save the kingdom.

Plot 
The story is based on the myth of King Arthur. A young, inexperienced squire Valiant, masquerading as Sir Gawain, is sent to accompany the Welsh princess Lady Ilene, a guest at Camelot, on her way back home. Little does he know that meanwhile, Arthur's wicked sister Morgan has retrieved a spellbook from Merlin's tomb and convinced the Viking warlord Sligon, ruler of the kingdom of Thule, to steal the magical sword Excalibur during a joust tournament.

Valiant and the princess become part of the struggle of "he who holds the sword rules the world" which leads them both to love and Valiant to his princely destiny, as it turns out he is the rightful heir to the throne of Thule. The usurper is killed by his also evil brother Thagnar. During the final confrontation, with the help of Thule's ruler Boltar, Morgan is destroyed, Thagnar is slain, and Valiant rescues the princess and recovers Excalibur.

Cast 
 Stephen Moyer as Prince Valiant
 Katherine Heigl as Princess Ilene
 Thomas Kretschmann as Thagnar
 Edward Fox as King Arthur
 Udo Kier as Sligon
 Joanna Lumley as Morgan le Fay
 Ron Perlman as Boltar
 Warwick Davis as Pechet
 Gavan O'Herlihy as King Thane
 Anthony Hickox as Sir Gawain
 Ben Pullen as Prince Arn
 Marcus Schenkenberg as Tiny

Production
The film was recut by German producer Bernd Eichinger without the knowledge of director Anthony Hickox. In his autobiography Size Matters Not: The Extraordinary Life & Career of Warwick Davis, Warwick Davis, an actor in the film, called it an "absolute disaster" which was "premiered, panned and bombed," and "even the wonderful Joanna Lumley - who still managed to put in an amazing performance as Morgan le Fay - couldn't save it." He blames this on the director, who he says "seemed intent on partying all night long and giving roles to his friends." His best friend, Captain Crunch, can be seen in various shots within the movie.

Reception
The film was generally poorly received. Empire gave Prince Valiant two stars out of five and stated, "a promising, swashbuckly romp is entirely scuppered by some indiscriminate broadsword editing, thereby removing any fun the name cast might have had, and leaving a poorly dubbed, effects-lacking film disappointingly limp." Some other reviews, however, were more positive. The Telegraph included it among top ten Arthurian films in 2014.

See also
Prince Valiant (1954 film)

References

External links
 
 
 

1997 films
1990s action films
1997 fantasy films
Arthurian films
British action adventure films
British fantasy adventure films
British independent films
English-language German films
English-language Irish films
Films based on American comics
Films based on comic strips
Films directed by Anthony Hickox
Films produced by Bernd Eichinger
Films shot in Wales
German action adventure films
German fantasy films
German independent films
Irish fantasy films
Irish independent films
Live-action films based on comics
Sword and sorcery films
Films about witchcraft
Prince Valiant
1997 independent films
1990s English-language films
1990s British films
1990s German films